Edward H. Hinchey (March 7, 1872 – July 14, 1936) was mayor of Ottawa, Ontario, Canada in 1912.

Hinchey worked in the weights and measures department of the federal government. He was first elected to city council in 1909. He replaced Charles Hopewell as mayor for a short period between June 21 and July 2 in 1912.

He died in Ottawa in 1936 when he was hit by a car while returning home. He was buried in Beechwood Cemetery.

References 

Chain of Office: Biographical Sketches of the Early Mayors of Ottawa (1847-1948), Dave Mullington

1872 births
1936 deaths
Mayors of Ottawa
Pedestrian road incident deaths
Road incident deaths in Canada
Accidental deaths in Ontario